Hatteras is an unincorporated village and census-designated place (CDP) in Dare County, North Carolina, United States, on the Outer Banks island of Hatteras, at its extreme southwestern tip. As of the 2010 census it had a population of 504. Immediately to the west of the village of Hatteras is Hatteras Inlet which separates Hatteras Island from the neighboring Ocracoke Island. North Carolina Highway 12 passes through the community linking it to Frisco to the east and Ocracoke to the west (via a ferry across Hatteras Inlet).

The residents of Hatteras are governed by the Dare County Board of Commissioners.  Hatteras is part of District 4, along with Avon, Buxton, Frisco, Rodanthe, Waves and Salvo.

Demographics

2020 census

As of the 2020 United States census, there were 577 people, 207 households, and 130 families residing in the CDP.

Attractions and recreation
Hatteras is best known as a fishing and kiteboarding destination.

Watersports are plentiful on both the ocean-side and the sound-side of the village. Proximity to the convergence of the Labrador Current and the Gulf Stream result in the largest surf available on the East Coast. On the protected Pamlico Sound side of the island, watersports such as windsurfing, kayaking, kiteboarding, and swimming are all readily available and accessible.

Fishing is a major source of recreation as well as revenue in Hatteras. Hatteras has two off shore fishing fleets. They operate out of Hatteras Harbor Marina, and Teach's Lair Marina

Pamlico Sound, which separates Hatteras and Ocracoke Islands, is one of the largest estuarine systems in the world and offers a variety of fishing opportunities.

The Village is also home to the Graveyard of The Atlantic Museum. A large museum dedicated to not only the Maritime History of the region but the thousands of ship wrecks off the coast of the island in the Graveyard of the Atlantic

Climate
Hatteras has a humid subtropical climate (Cfa). Hatteras experiences hot summers, somewhat moderated by the Atlantic Ocean, and some of the mildest winters in the entire state, with no month having an average low temperature below . Because of its location many miles off the coast of Mainland USA  in the direct path of the gulf stream, Hatteras experiences year round low temperatures similar to the northern gulf of Florida or southern coastal Georgia, despite being much farther north.

History
Hatteras was named after the Hatteras Indians.

The tear was subsequently repaired and restored by sand dredged by the Army Corps of Engineers.

The Ellsworth and Lovie Ballance House and Hatteras Weather Bureau Station are listed on the National Register of Historic Places.

Transportation
Hatteras is served by Billy Mitchell Airport.

The Village is also home to the Hatteras-Ocracoke Ferry terminal which is the only way for people to access Ocracoke Island from Hatteras Village other than air travel.

Education
Residents are zoned to Dare County Schools. Zoned schools are Cape Hatteras Elementary School and Cape Hatteras Secondary School. The schools are located on NC 12 in Buxton.

Dare County Library has a branch in Hatteras.

Gallery

Notes

References

External links
 Graveyard of the Atlantic Museum
 Cape Hatteras National Seashore (U.S. National Park Service)

Census-designated places in Dare County, North Carolina
Beaches of North Carolina
Hatteras Island
Beaches of Dare County, North Carolina
Populated coastal places in North Carolina